was a town located in Yamamoto District, Akita Prefecture, Japan.

As of 2003, the town had an estimated population of 8,042 and a density of 82.04 persons per km2. The total area is 98.02 km2.

On March 20, 2006, Yamamoto, along with the towns of Koto'oka and Hachiryū (all from Yamamoto District), was merged to create the town of Mitane.

External links
 Mitane official website 

Dissolved municipalities of Akita Prefecture
Mitane, Akita